The quince monitor (Varanus melinus) is a species of monitor lizards endemic to Indonesia. It is very closely related to the mangrove monitor (Varanus indicus), with both belonging to the subgenus Euprepiosaurus.

Description
The quince monitor has a bright yellow head, legs, back and tail. Varanus melinus has a black reticulation on the lower part of its neck. The tail has alternating bands of yellow and black which get pale toward the last third. Its tongue is light pink in color with little variation. The quince monitor's nostril is situated closer to the tip of its snout than to its eye. This species can reach  in total length. This species is very similar in morphology to the mangrove monitor. Baby quince monitors will be darker in color and will gradually get brighter yellow with age.

Distribution
The quince monitor is likely endemic to the Sula Islands in Indonesia, but it reportedly may occur in Banggai. Initially it was reported to originate from the Obi Islands, but this was only an intermediate wildlife trade station. It is threatened by habitat loss and collection for the wildlife trade.

References

Reptiles of Indonesia
Reptiles described in 1997
Varanus